Thomas Dodd Knowles (May 17, 1868 – September 20, 1935) was an American football and baseball coach. He served as the head football coach at the University of Connecticut from 1899 to 1901. He also served as UConn's head baseball coach from 1899 to 1901.

References

External links
 

1868 births
1935 deaths
UConn Huskies football coaches
UConn Huskies baseball coaches
People from Waterbury, Connecticut
Players of American football from Connecticut